Lakshman Prabhu was a minister in the court of the Silhara dynasty that ruled the islands that today constitute the Indian city of Mumbai. He belonged to the Prabhu community of Konkan. He is known for overseeing the construction of the famous Walkeshwar Temple and the adjoining Banganga Tank in 1127 AD. The temple, later destroyed by the Portuguese, was rebuilt in 1711 in the South Mumbai precincts of Mumbai city.

References

History of Mumbai
People from Maharashtra